is a 1984 Japanese documentary film by Hiroshi Teshigahara about the works of Antoni Gaudi. In the film the director visits the buildings including houses in Barcelona and the Sagrada Família.

Reception
The Village Voice wrote a  review describing the film as "Something of a passion project, completed decades after an earlier visit by the director, the film is given over to an eager, rolling catalog of Gaudí's fin-de-siècle works sans much voiceover or any explanatory text". The New York Times wrote that "Much of the imagery in 'Gaudi' is nothing less than astounding in its beauty and boldness, and the blending of a neo-Gothic mysticism and grandeur with an Art Nouveau line and a surreal apprehension of the power of nature".

References

External links
 
 
 
Antonio Gaudí: Border Crossings an essay by Dore Ashton at the Criterion Collection

1984 films
1980s Spanish-language films
Documentary films about architecture
Japanese documentary films
1984 documentary films
Films directed by Hiroshi Teshigahara
1980s Japanese films